The Spinoasa gas field natural gas field is located near Săcuieu in Cluj County. It was discovered in 1980 and developed by Romgaz. It began production in 1985 and produces natural gas and condensates. The total proven reserves of the Spinoasa gas field are around 1.045 trillion cubic feet (30 km³), and production is slated to be around 100 million cubic feet/day (3×105m³).

References

Natural gas fields in Romania